The 1895 Tennessee Volunteers football team unofficially represented the University of Tennessee as an independent during the 1895 college football season. In October 1894, the Athletic Association had resolved to drop varsity football and look forward to baseball in the spring of 1895. These unofficial games, referred to as "The Lost Years", are not included in NCAA statistics or in official UT win–loss records. 1895 was the second and final student-coached team.

W. B. Stokely, a UT senior who transferred from Wake Forest University in 1894, again persuaded a group of students to form a team in the fall of 1895. Stokely, who was elected captain, gave encouragement and direction to the other players. Even though the institution chose not to be represented officially on the gridiron in 1895, as in 1894, Stokely and his unofficial team kept football interest alive during this period when almost certainly it otherwise would have been allowed to lapse completely.

Schedule

References

Tennessee
Tennessee Volunteers football seasons
Tennessee Volunteers football